Vítor Leonel Simões Fernandes Bernardo (born 31 Março 1970), commonly known as Nelito, is a Portuguese futsal coach and former futsal player who played as a pivot. He is the head coach of the Lisbon Division of Honour club Novos Talentos. As a player Nelito was the 2000–01 Portuguese Futsal First Division top scorer while playing for Sporting Vila Verde and he won two Portuguese futsal leagues with Benfica. Nelito played for the Portugal national team in the 1999 Euros and the 2000 World Cup.

References

External links

1970 births
Living people
Portuguese men's futsal players
S.L. Benfica futsal players